The Long and Third Commercial Building was a historic building in Downtown Columbus, Ohio. It was listed on the National Register of Historic Places in 1982. The four-story building was constructed in the Second Renaissance Revival style.

The building, completed c. 1900, was one of few remaining turn-of-the-century commercial buildings in Downtown Columbus. It was also significant for its unusually high level of detail and fine craftsmanship. Over its life, the building housed over 45 different tenants. Some of the most notable were the Columbus-New Albany-Johnstown Traction Company, an early interurban streetcar company, the Eugene Gallagher cigar company, the Voisinet Garment Company, Pappas' Philadelphia Restaurant, and the Sportsman's Grill Restaurant. At the time of its National Register nomination, the building was deteriorating, and its owners sought an extensive rehabilitation benefited by historic preservation tax credits.

See also
 National Register of Historic Places listings in Columbus, Ohio

References

Commercial buildings completed in 1899
Commercial buildings on the National Register of Historic Places in Ohio
National Register of Historic Places in Columbus, Ohio
Demolished buildings and structures in Downtown Columbus, Ohio